Pretty/Groovy is an album by jazz trumpeter Chet Baker recorded in 1953 and 1954 (with one track from 1957) and released on the World Pacific label in 1958. The album compiles tracks previously released on the 1953 10-inch LP Chet Baker Quartet featuring Russ Freeman along with previously unissued recordings.

Reception

Allmusic rated the album with 3 stars.

Track listing
 "Look for the Silver Lining" (Buddy DeSylva, Jerome Kern) – 2:42     
 "Time After Time" (Sammy Cahn, Jule Styne) – 2:48    
 "Travelin' Light" (Trummy Young, Jimmy Mundy, Johnny Mercer) – 3:10    
 "My Funny Valentine" (Lorenz Hart, Richard Rodgers) – 2:21    
 "There Will Never Be Another You" (Harry Warren, Mack Gordon) – 3:01    
 "The Thrill Is Gone" (Lew Brown, Ray Henderson) – 2:48     
 "But Not for Me" (George Gershwin, Ira Gershwin) – 3:05    
 "Band Aid" (Russ Freeman) – 2:45    
 "The Lamp Is Low" (Peter DeRose, Bert Shefter) – 2:33    
 "Carson City Stage" (Carson Smith) – 2:37    
 "Long Ago (and Far Away)" (Jerome Kern, Ira Gershwin) – 2:15    
 "Easy to Love" (Cole Porter) – 3:03    
 "Winter Wonderland" (Felix Bernard, Richard B. Smith) – 2:28    
 "Batter Up" (Freeman) – 2:56
Recorded in Los Angeles on July 27, 29 & 30, 1953 (tracks 9–12 & 14), at Radio Recorders in Hollywood on October 3, 1953 (tracks 6 & 8) and October 27, 1953 (track 13), at Capitol Studios in Hollywood on February 15, 1954 (tracks 1, 2, 4, 5 & 7) and in New York City on December 9, 1957 (track 3)

Personnel
Chet Baker – trumpet, vocals
Jimmy Giuffre – clarinet (track 5)
Bill Perkins – tenor saxophone (tracks 1, 2, 4 & 7) 
Russ Freeman – piano (tracks 1, 2 & 4–14)
Dave Wheat – guitar (track 3)
Joe Mondragon (track 13), Russ Saunders (track 3), Carson Smith (tracks 1, 2, 4–8, 10–12 & 14), Bob Whitlock (track 9) – bass
Larry Bunker (tracks 6, 8, 10–12 & 14), Shelly Manne (track 13), Bob Neal (tracks 1, 2, 4, 5 & 7), Bobby White (track 9) – drums

References 

1958 albums
Chet Baker albums
World Pacific Records albums